Budya is a minor Bantu language. It is listed among Luban languages in Maho (2009).

Shona (Korekore) has a dialect of the same name (Budya/Budjga) in Zimbabwe.

References

Luban languages
Languages of the Democratic Republic of the Congo